"Ghost Rider" is the alias used by a Swedish motorcycle stunt rider, called "probably the most famous flaunter  of road rules the world has ever seen", whose internet videos have achieved a "cult following" with millions of views.

Biography
Ghost Rider performs in a series of independently produced DVD films where the recurring theme involves  him performing illegal maneuvers on his motorcycle on public roads across Sweden and other countries in Europe. The films show Ghost Rider, mostly in the perspective of cameras mounted on his motorbike, riding at extreme speeds on busy roads, provoking law enforcement officers into high-speed chases and performing various stunts. Ghost Rider usually wears black leathers and a black helmet with black visor to help protect his identity.

Motorbikes used in the films are the Suzuki GSX-R1000 and Suzuki GSX-1300R (Hayabusa). He has used a variety of different year models with differing modifications to each, including a carbon fibre GSX-R1000 K4 in Ghost Rider Goes Crazy in Europe and a 280+ brake horsepower turbocharged GSX-R1000 K5 in Ghost Rider Goes Undercover.

Swedish rock band Europe used various clips from the Ghost Rider movies in their music video for the song "Got to Have Faith" from their 2004 album Start from the Dark.

Identity
Ghost Rider has been identified by various media as being, or as possibly being, Swedish ex-racer and mechanic Patrik Fürstenhoff. Fürstenhoff is listed at Guinness World Records as holding the record for the first documented  wheelie on a  turbocharged Suzuki Hayabusa, and an earlier wheelie record.

Notable feats
In Ghost Rider: The Final Ride, Ghost Rider does a timed run in Sweden from Stockholm to Uppsala (dubbed Uppsala Run, a distance of 68 km or 42.6 miles) in 14m 55s with an average speed of 273.1 km/h (170.1 mph) in heavy traffic. He breaks his own record in Uppsala Run 2 (Ghost Rider Goes Crazy in Europe) with a faster bike by a mere two seconds (14m 53s) with even heavier traffic present.
In Ghost Rider Goes Crazy in Europe, Ghost Rider does a timed run in Paris, France on the Paris Peripherique (French term for ring road/beltway) and completes the circuit with an elapsed time of 9m 57s. This was done as a tribute to a French street racer going by the alias "Le Prince Noir" (The Black Prince) who completed the circuit on his motorcycle in 11m 04s in 1989.
Also in Ghost Rider Goes Crazy in Europe, Ghost Rider does a timed run in the Netherlands from Rotterdam to Amsterdam (a distance of approximately 70 kilometers) in 20m 32s.

Vehicles
Each movie has a scene where Ghost Rider rides a highly tuned, turbocharged Suzuki Hayabusa. Although Ghost Rider's primary vehicle is a motorcycle, he uses a wide variety of other vehicles in the movies including different types of cars, bicycles, minibikes and even a snowmobile on public streets.

Filmography
To date, a total of six Ghost Rider titles have been released. The fifth, titled Ghost Rider: Back to Basics was originally due to be released in December 2006. However, due to unforeseen circumstances it wasn't released until 15 February 2008. The latest, Ghost Rider 6.66: What the F**k, was released in 2012.

See also
Motorcycle hooliganism
Getaway in Stockholm

Notes

References

 

Swedish YouTubers
Motorcycling mass media people
Living people
Anonymity pseudonyms
Swedish outlaws
Motorcycle stunt performers
Fugitives wanted by Sweden
21st century in Sweden
Year of birth missing (living people)
World record setters in motorcycling